Herbert Lawford defeated Ernest Renshaw 5–7, 6–1, 0–6, 6–2, 6–4 in the All Comers' Final, but the reigning champion William Renshaw defeated Herbert Lawford 7–5, 6–2, 4–6, 7–5 in the challenge round to win the gentlemen's singles tennis title at the 1885 Wimbledon Championships.

Draw

Challenge round

All comers' finals

Top half

Bottom half

References

External links

Gentlemen's Singles
Wimbledon Championship by year – Men's singles